Layia heterotricha is a species of flowering plant in the family Asteraceae known by the common name pale yellow tidytips, or pale yellow layia.

Distribution
It is endemic to California, where it is known from several areas in the west-central part of the state, such as the Santa Monica Mountains and lower San Joaquin Valley.

Description
Layia heterotricha is an annual herb producing a thick, erect stem to a maximum height near 90 centimeters. The stem and foliage are covered thinly in dark glandular hairs and the plant has a scent similar to apples or bananas. The leaves are oval-shaped, fleshy, and sometimes slightly toothed.

The flower head contains white to pale yellow ray florets each up to 2.5 centimeters long, and many yellow disc florets with yellow anthers. The fruit is an achene; fruits on the disc florets often have a long pappus.

External links

Layia heterotricha. Jepson eFlora.
Layia heterotricha. USDA PLANTS.
Layia heterotricha. CalPhotos.

heterotricha
Endemic flora of California
Natural history of the California chaparral and woodlands
Natural history of the California Coast Ranges
Natural history of the Central Valley (California)
Natural history of the Transverse Ranges